Siwakoti also spelled as Shiwakoti, Sibakoti, Shibakoti or Shivakoti, is a surname used by certain subgroup belonging to the Brahmin caste, Kshetri and natives of Nepal, Northeast India, & Bhutan. Siwakoti is a sub caste referred to as thar in the Nepalese community.

According to their traditions they are the descendants of the Rishi Bharadwaja. Siwakoti belongs to Bharadwaj gotra(clan).

Notable people 
 Chintamani Siwakoti, Deputy Governor of Nepal Rastra Bank
 Barsha Siwakoti, Nepali Film Actress
 Dr. Yam Siwakoti, A. Professor, University of Technology Sydney.
 Hari Siwakoti - Nepali Film Actor/Director(First Nepali film made in USA)

References

Ethnic groups in Nepal
Bahun
Hindu communities
Nepali-language surnames
Surnames of Nepalese origin
Khas surnames